Siegfried Fülle (born 6 October 1939) is a German former gymnast. He competed at the 1960, 1964 and 1968 Summer Olympics in all artistic gymnastics events and won two bronze medals with the German team, in 1964 and 1968. Individually his best achievement was sharing seventh place on the vault in 1964. He won one more bronze medal in the team competition at the 1966 World Artistic Gymnastics Championships.

References

External links

1939 births
Living people
Sportspeople from Thuringia
German male artistic gymnasts
Olympic gymnasts of the United Team of Germany
Olympic gymnasts of East Germany
Gymnasts at the 1960 Summer Olympics
Gymnasts at the 1964 Summer Olympics
Gymnasts at the 1968 Summer Olympics
Olympic bronze medalists for the United Team of Germany
Olympic bronze medalists for East Germany
Olympic medalists in gymnastics
People from Greiz
Medalists at the 1968 Summer Olympics
Medalists at the 1964 Summer Olympics
Medalists at the World Artistic Gymnastics Championships